Integrated reporting (IR, or <IR> in International Integrated Reporting Council publications) in corporate communication is  a "process that results in communication, most visibly a periodic “integrated report”, about value creation over time. An integrated report is a concise communication about how an organization's strategy, governance, performance and prospects lead to the creation of value over the short, medium and long term."

It means the integrated representation of a company's performance in terms of both financial and  other value relevant information. Integrated Reporting provides greater context for performance data, clarifies how valuable relevant information fits into operations or a business, and may help make company decision making more long-term. While the communications that result from IR will be of benefit to a range of stakeholders, they are principally aimed at providers of financial capital allocation decisions.

IR helps to complete financial and sustainability reports. A framework has been published, but some questions remain in order to know how to apply it. Do we need a new report? Do we need one report ? Will this report be useful for investors, and for other stakeholders? Other questions could have been raised, such as who is really working for an integrated reporting, and who has interests in it.

In June 2021, the International Integrated Reporting Council and the Sustainability Accounting Standards Board announced their combination to form the Value Reporting Foundation (VRF). In November 2021, the IFRS Foundation announced it would consolidate the VRF and Climate Disclosure Standards Board with its own newly formed International Sustainability Standards Board by June 2022.

The call for integrated reporting 
Capitalism relies on the efficient allocation of capital to deliver returns to investors over the short, medium and long term. It is the job of companies to manage the financial capital that investors provide and also to create and preserve the value generated from other forms of non-financial data such as people, trademarks/copyrights and natural resources or nature, the basis of all life. The western model of capitalism has been questioned following the onset of the banking crisis in 2007 because of its apparent dependence on short-term financial factors over other forms of capital and longer time scales. Corporate reporting no longer reflects the needs of the 21st century, resilient capitalism needs financial stability and sustainability in its exchange with nature in order to succeed – and Integrated Reporting is intended to underpin both of these problems through communicating to providers of financial capital the information that they need. Therefore, a report of financial data is no longer sufficient, but has to be extended with information about our exchanges with nature, as money is not natural, but a 7,000 year old cultural invention. Nature has never invented a means for its exchanges.

At the heart of IR is the growing realization that a wide range of factors determine the value of an organization – some of these are financial or tangible in nature and are easy to account for in financial statements (e.g. property, cash), while many such as intellectual capital, competition and energy security are not. IR reflects the broad and longer-term consequences of the decisions organizations make, based on a wide range of factors, in order to create and sustain value. IR enables an organization to communicate in a clear, articulate way how it is drawing on all the resources and relationships it utilises to create and preserve value in the short, medium and long term, helping investors to manage risks and allocate resources most efficiently.

It is therefore necessary, to extend the reporting of only financial data with ecological data, for example about carbon dioxide emissions a company generates. When according to the 2015 Paris climate agreement carbon dioxide emissions should be reduced, than at first a report about this is necessary to aim at saving them. Integrated Reporting therefore needs two sides, the financial balancing data as well the non-financial ecological data, it must aim at two achievements: annual financial profit per as well as profit for nature, e.g. reductions in CO2 emissions.

History of integrated reporting 
In  2009, the Prince of Wales convened a high-level meeting of investors, standard setters, companies, accounting bodies and UN representatives including The Prince's Accounting for Sustainability Project, International Federation of Accountants (IFAC), and the Global Reporting Initiative (GRI), to establish the International Integrated Reporting Committee (IIRC), a body to oversee the creation of a globally accepted Integrated Reporting framework. In November 2011, the Committee was renamed the International Integrated Reporting Council.

Timeline

International Integrated Reporting Council 

The International Integrated Reporting Council (IIRC), of which Mervyn King is chair, was convened in order to aid  businesses and investors as they begin to adopt Integrated Reporting. Launched in 2010 by the Prince of Wales with international partners. The IIRC was formerly known as the International Integrated Reporting Committee, being renamed in 2011. The Prince's Accounting for Sustainability Project (A4S) acted as the Secretariat for the IIRC until January 2012.

The IIRC calls itself 'a global coalition of regulators, investors, companies, standard setters, the accounting profession and NGOs. Together, this coalition shares the view that communication about businesses' value creation should be the next step in the evolution of corporate reporting'. It states its mission is to create the globally accepted International IR Framework that elicits from organizations material information about their strategy, governance, performance and prospects in a clear, concise and comparable format. The Framework is intended to underpin and accelerate the evolution of corporate reporting, reflecting developments in financial governance, management commentary and sustainability reporting.

The IIRC produced a 'Discussion Paper' in 2011 from which the overwhelming feedback demonstrated overwhelming support for Integrated Reporting and endorsed the development of a global Framework. It also concluded that the primary audience of integrated reports is investors in order to aid their allocation of financial capital.

The IIRC Pilot Programme 

The IIRC began a Pilot Programme in 2011 in order to underpin the development of the International Integrated Reporting Framework. The group of organizations participating in the Pilot Programme have the opportunity to contribute to the development of the Framework. Paul Druckman, CEO IIRC, said "We call the Pilot Programme our "innovation hub" - made up of people who want to push the boundaries just a little bit further, to challenge, or at least question orthodox thinking, and to acknowledge the importance of reporting to the way our organizations think and behave".

There are over 90 businesses in the Pilot Programme Business Network include Unilever, Coca-Cola, Microsoft, China Light and Power, Hyundai, Diesel & Motor Engineering PLC (Dimo-Sri Lanka) and HSBC.

The IIRC, in collaboration with UNPRI set up an Investor Network as part of its Pilot Programme. It is made up of over 30 investor organizations in order to help shape the Framework by providing an investor's perspective on the shortfalls in current corporate reporting.

The International Integrated Reporting Framework 

The IIRC was created with the remit of developing the globally accepted International IR Framework that elicits from organizations material information about their strategy, governance, performance and prospects in a clear, concise and comparable format. The Framework will underpin and accelerate the evolution of corporate reporting, reflecting developments in financial, governance, management commentary and sustainability reporting. The benefits of the Framework are purported to be the enabling of informed decision-making that leads to efficient capital allocation and the creation and preservation of value.

The Framework is ultimately intended as a guidance for all businesses producing integrated reports.

National integrated reporting practices

Netherlands
The Dutch accountancy body, NBA (Koninklijke Nederlandse Beroepsorganisatie van Accountants) announced in 2015 that it would be collaborating with the IIRC "to increase the momentum towards integrated reporting by raising awareness in markets across the world".

South Africa
Corporate reporting on financial and non-financial information in a single document has grown as companies such as BlackSun have produced research which suggests that producing integrated reports will have a strong correlation to the resilience and ability of a business to create value in the short, medium and long term. For many years businesses have been producing both Annual Reports and separate sustainability reports. However, increasingly often businesses are starting to produce integrated reports. On 1 March 2010 the Johannesburg Stock Exchange (JSE) adopted the King III principles as part of its listing requirements, which require listed companies to apply King III or explain which recommendations have not been applied and publicly provide reasons therefore. King III recommends Integrated Reporting and hence the requirements for listed companies to issue integrated reports.

In the King III Report (otherwise known as King Code of Governance for South Africa 2009), Integrated Reporting is referred to in this manner: "A key challenge for leadership is to make sustainability issues mainstream. Strategy, risk, performance and sustainability have become inseparable; hence the phrase ‘integrated reporting’ which is used throughout this Report."

See also 
Corporate social responsibility
Environmental Social and Corporate Governance
EthicalQuote
Financial statement
Islamic Reporting Initiative
King Report on Corporate Governance
Social accounting
Socially responsible investing
Sustainability reporting
Triple bottom line

References

External Links 

 The 8 content elements of an Integrated Reportby reportyak.com
 7 Guiding Principles of Integrated Reporting by reportyak.com

Corporate governance